The Myanmar National League Cup is the annual football tournament of the Myanmar National League (MNL), the newly founded top level professional league of Myanmar. The first edition of the tournament, MNL Cup 2009 kicked off the MNL competition although the league began its first full season only in early 2010.

Results

References

 

 
2
Cup